Lee Jae-yeong (born ) is a South Korean volleyball player. She played as the Outside Hitter for the South Korea women's national volleyball team. She is the twin sister of Lee Da-yeong, who was also a member of the South Korea national volleyball team.

Career

2014 FIVB World Grand Prix placing in eighth place. With the club 2014-2015 Incheon Heungkuk Life Pink Spiders, Lee ended up in fourth place in the Korean V-League.

Lee played the 2015 FIVB Women's World Cup Volleyball ranking in the sixth place,

She played with her National team the 2016 World Olympics Qualification Tournament ranking in fourth place and qualifying for the 2016 Summer Olympics, were her team ended up in fifth place. She ranked in sixth place at the 2017 FIVB Volleyball Women's World Grand Champions Cup and played the 2018 FIVB Volleyball Women's World Championship qualification.

Personal life
Lee Jae-yeong was born on 15 October 1996 as one of twin daughters to Kim Gyeong-hui and Lee Ju-hyeong. Her mother is Kim Gyeong-hui who played as a setter for the South Korea women's national volleyball team at the 1988 Summer Olympics.

Lee studied in the Jeonju Jungsan Elementary School, the Jinju Gyeonghae Girls' Middle School and the Jinju Sunmyung Girls' High School. Her twin sister Lee Da-yeong is also a national volleyball player.

The sisters were both suspended indefinitely by their club after being anonymously accused of bullying online. They have however claimed that many of the bullying accusations made towards them were false, and plan on taking legal action against the anonymous author of the online post.

Club career
  Incheon Heungkuk Life Pink Spiders (2014–2021)
  PAOK Thessaloniki (2021–2022)

Team 

Korean V-League
 Champion (1): 2018-19
 Runners-up (1): 2016-17

Individuals 
Korean V-League Final "MVP" (1): 2018-19
Korean V-League "MVP" (2): 2016-17, 2018–19
Korean V-League "Best 7" (5): 2015–16, 2016–17, 2017–18, 2018–19, 2019–20
Korean V-League "MVP of the Round" (5): 2014-15 6R, 2015-16 1R, 2016-17 2R, 2018-19 3R,6R
Korean V-League "Rookie of the Year" (1): 2014-15
Korean V-League "All-Star MVP" (1): 2018-19
 Dong-A Sports Awards -"Women's Volleyball Player of the Year" (1): 2019

International career

National Team 
Summer Olympics
2016 – 5th
FIVB World Championship
2018 – 17th
FIVB World Cup
2015 – 6th
2019 – 6th
FIVB Volleyball Nations League
2018 – 12th
FIVB World Grand Prix
2014 – 8th
FIVB World Grand Champions Cup
2017 – 6th
Asian Games
2014 – 1st
2018 –  3rd
Asian Championship
2013 –  3rd
2015 –  2nd
2019 –  3rd
AVC Cup
 2014 –  2nd
Asian Junior Championship
2012 - 5th
2014 -  3rd

Individuals 
 2014 Asian Junior Championship "Best Outside Spiker"

References

External links
 FIVB Profile

1996 births
Living people
South Korean women's volleyball players
Volleyball players at the 2014 Asian Games
Volleyball players at the 2018 Asian Games
Medalists at the 2014 Asian Games
Medalists at the 2018 Asian Games
Asian Games medalists in volleyball
Asian Games gold medalists for South Korea
Asian Games bronze medalists for South Korea
People from Jeonju
Volleyball players at the 2016 Summer Olympics
Olympic volleyball players of South Korea
Twin sportspeople
Sportspeople from North Jeolla Province